Dame Ila Dianne Thompson, DBE ( Wood; born 31 December 1950) is a British businesswoman. She was Chief Executive Officer of Camelot Group from 2000 to 2014.

Early life and education
Thompson was born on 31 December 1950 to Ronald and Joan ( Pinder) Wood. Thompson was educated at the Batley Girls’ Grammar School.

She earned Bachelor of Arts in French and English from the University of London  as an external student  at Manchester Polytechnic (now Manchester Metropolitan University).

Career
Thompson joined Camelot in 1997 and was appointed CEO in 2000. In April 2014 it was announced that Thompson would step down from the position from 31 October. Since 2015, she has been a non-executive director of Next plc.

In 2014, Thompson was among candidates considered to succeed Chris Patten as Chair of the BBC Trust, but in August, it was announced that the position would be given to Rona Fairhead, a former Chair of Financial Times Group.

It was confirmed in 2014 that Thompson had assumed ownership of The George Hotel on the Isle of Wight and that she had plans to reinvigorate the hotel and its dining offer.

From Commander of the Order of the British Empire (CBE), Thompson was elevated to Dame Commander of the Order of the British Empire (DBE) in the 2015 New Year Honours for services to the National Lottery and charitable services.

Personal life
Thompson married Roger Thompson in 1972. They had a daughter, and separated in 1992.

Arms

References

Living people
1950 births
Place of birth missing (living people)
Alumni of University of London Worldwide
Alumni of the University of London
Alumni of Manchester Metropolitan University
English women in business
British chief executives
British corporate directors
Dames Commander of the Order of the British Empire